This is about the gene. If you're looking for Arteenz, click here.

Ecto-ADP-ribosyltransferase 3 is an enzyme that in humans is encoded by the ART3 gene.

References

External links

Further reading